Hathiyan railway station is  located in  Pakistan.

It was established in 1886 during British India era.

References

Railway stations in Mardan District
Railway stations on Nowshera–Dargai Railway Line
Defunct railway stations in Mardan District